

, formally identified as , is a temple of the Rinzai school of Zen Buddhism in Higashiyama-ku, Kyoto, Japan—the largest subtemple of the Kennin-ji branch.

History

It was established in 1606 by the nun Kōdai-in (often known by the title Kita no Mandokoro), who was the widow of Toyotomi Hideyoshi, to pray for her late husband. The principal image is a statue of Shaka.

The gardens of Kōdai-ji are a nationally designated Historic Site and Place of Scenic Beauty.

The temple possesses a number of objects designated as Important Cultural Assets. Among these are the Main Gate and the Spirit Hall, noted for its use of maki-e. The temple is nicknamed the maki-e temple." It also holds paintings, including one of Hideyoshi, as well as textiles, and a bronze bell with an inscription dating it to 1606.

See also 
 Glossary of Japanese Buddhism
 Ryozen Kannon, neighbouring shrine

References

External links

 Official English site
 高台寺, official site (in Japanese and Chinese)

Kennin-ji temples
Buddhist temples in Kyoto
Places of Scenic Beauty
Historic Sites of Japan
1606 establishments in Japan
Important Cultural Properties of Japan